John Carden may refer to:

Sir John Carden, 6th Baronet (1892–1935), English tank and vehicle designer
John Carden (baseball) (1921–1949), Major League Baseball pitcher
John Surman Carden (1771–1858), British Royal Navy officer
John Carden (soccer), member of the U.S. soccer team at the 1956 Summer Olympics
John Carden (Combat Sports Promoter) - Promoter of first state sanctioned bareknuckle bout in Kansas history. Professional boxing record 1-1. Brother of pro boxer Brian Carden.

See also
Carden baronets
Carden (disambiguation)